Uskovnica is an Alpine pasture on Pokljuka plain in the Bohinj area, belonging to the village Srednja vas v Bohinju. The majority of the alm cottages are now used as vacation and tourist facilities.

History

It was first mentioned in 1489. The name has probably a phytonymic origin. The plain was known to tourists in the 19th century as a point on the path to Triglav. A number of Slovene fiction works use Uskovnica as a setting. Before the World War II there was a hotel.

On November 11th 1944 500 Germans attacked the Jesenice-Bohinj partisan troops settled at Uskovnica. The partisans escaped after short shooting. Janez Oblak (44), a permanent Uskovnica resident, was shot by German soldiers at the entrance into his house and thrown into flames. A monument to 4 victims of Uskovnica has been set close to the abandoned sirarna (cheese cottage). German troops burnt 150 cottages, stalls and haybarns at Uskovnica and took away 40 cows and oxen.

Tourism   

After World War II Uskovnica was rebuilt. Some town people bought the ruins where they put up their summer facilities. The mountaineering association of Bohinj built a mountain guest house in 1955. It has two dining rooms that can sit 100 people, 46 beds in 16 rooms and an additional 28 beds in the cheese cottage adjacent to the hut. The hut location: 

Uskovnica is a starting point for the following tours: 

Summits
Veliki Draški vrh (2243 m), 3h 30 hribi.net
Viševnik (2050 m), 3h hribi.net
Tosc (2275 m), 4h hribi.net

Mountain huts
Blejska koča na Lipanci (1630 m), 4h hribi.net
Vodnikov dom na Velem polju (1817 m) 3h hribi.net; additional 4 hour are needed to get to Triglav (2864 m) 
Planinska koča na Vojah (690 m), 1h 30 hribi.net
Zajamniki pasture (1280 m), 1h 15 hribi.net
hotel Šport, Goreljek pasture (1250 m) hribi.net via Rudno polje 2h 30  
mountain biking tour: Srednja vas-Uskovnica-Rudno polje-Gorjuše-Koprivnik-Češnjica-Srednja vas

Access by car
 from Srednja vas (8 km dust-road, badly maintained at the end, parking place 15 minutes away from the guest house)
 from Rudno polje (3 km of bad dust-road, parking place 15 minutes away from the guest house).

References

 Koča na Uskovnici mountain hut. Hribi.net.
 Mile Pavlin: Požig Uskovnice [The burning of Uskovnica]. Jeseniško-bohinjski odred. Ljubljana, 1970.

Plateaus in Upper Carniola
Municipality of Bohinj
Triglav National Park